The 1985 Brisbane Rugby League premiership was the 77th season of Brisbane's semi-professional rugby league football competition. Eight teams from across Brisbane competed for the premiership, which culminated in a grand final match between the Southern Suburbs and Wynnum-Manly clubs.

Season summary 
Teams played each other three times, with 21 rounds of competition played. It resulted in a top four of Southern Suburbs, Past Brothers, Wynnum-Manly and Fortitude Valley.

Teams

Finals

Grand Final 

Southern Suburbs 10 (Tries: N. Carr. Goals: G. French 3.)

Wynnum-Manly 8 (Tries: C. Adams. Goals: W. Green 2.)

Winfield State League 

The 1985 Winfield State League was the inaugural season of the Queensland Rugby League's statewide competition. A total of 14 teams competed in the season, 8 of which were BRL Premiership clubs. The remaining six were regional teams from across the state, hence the State League name. The finals were straight final four series held at QRL headquarters at Lang Park, with Wynnum-Manly and the Brisbane Brothers winning their respective semi finals. In the final, the Seagulls completed a 16-0 shutout of the Brothers to win their second consecutive Winfield State League title.

References

Rugby league in Brisbane
Brisbane Rugby League season